Grasmere is the name of a neighborhood located on the East Shore of Staten Island, one of the five boroughs of New York City.  

Grasmere although crossed by major roads has retained its quiet suburban character.  The area and adjoining Concord was dotted with lakes and ponds similar to the English Lake District village of Grasmere. The name is often attributed to Sir Roderick Cameron, an American resident of Canadian descent who was knighted by Queen Victoria.

Transportation
The Staten Island Railway stops in the neighborhood's eponymous station. The distance between Grasmere station and next station north in Clifton is the longest between any two stations on the system.

Grasmere is also served by the  local buses on Hylan Boulevard and the  local bus on Clove Road. Express bus service is provided by the SIM1, SIM7 and SIM10 on Hylan Boulevard, the SIM15 on Targee Street (northbound) and Richmond Road (southbound), the SIM3C and SIM35 Narrows Road, and the SIM30 on Tompkins Ave.

Points of interest
950 Fingerboard Road in Grasmere is the location of the executive offices of the Staten Island Advance, the island's daily newspaper.

Brady's Pond is a privately owned pond located south of the Staten Island Expressway between the Staten Island Railway and Hylan Boulevard. The pond abuts several houses in Grasmere. It is owned and operated by the Cameron Club of Staten Island, and access to the pond is restricted to members of the club. The neighborhood's only public park, Brady's Pond Preserve, is located at the pond's northwest corner.

Notable residents
In music, second drummer of Twisted Sister, A. J. Pero grew up on West Fingerboard Road.
In television, One Day At A Time's Glenn Scarpelli grew up on Normalee Road.
The mafioso Aniello Dellacroce resided in Grasmere at the time of his death on December 2, 1985.
Former member of the New York State Assembly, Matthew Mirones, is a Grasmere resident and former President of the Grasmere Civic Association.
Cassius Marcellus Coolidge, the artist who created the famous Dogs Playing Poker paintings, lived in Grasmere toward the end of his life.
Sir Roderick Cameron, a 19th-century shipping executive, established a local horse-breeding farm.
David Carr, Member of the New York City Council from the 50th District, which includes Grasmere.

References

Neighborhoods in Staten Island